Release Magazine is an independent alternative music online magazine based in Gothenburg, Sweden. It was born in Umeå in 1986. The first years it was run by Britta Näsman as an A5 fanzine, just for fun. When she moved to Belgium, Mikael Kahrle and Lotta Kahrle (then Jansson) took over the business gradually. They wanted to slowly convert Release to a real magazine, which they did. The web magazine was established in 1997, while the printed version was published until August 1998.

References

External links
 Release Magazine

1986 establishments in Sweden
1998 disestablishments in Sweden
Defunct magazines published in Sweden
Internet properties established in 1997
Magazines established in 1986
Magazines disestablished in 1998
Mass media in Gothenburg
Mass media in Umeå
Music review websites
Swedish music websites
Online magazines with defunct print editions
Online music magazines